Fort Churchill may refer to:

Manitoba, Canada
 Fort Churchill, a former military installation that is now the Churchill Airport
 Churchill Rocket Research Range, a former rocket launch facility sometimes referred to as Fort Churchill
 Prince of Wales Fort, an 18th-century Hudson Bay Company fort also known as Fort Churchill

Nevada, United States
 Fort Churchill, located in Fort Churchill State Historic Park
 Fort Churchill and Sand Springs Toll Road

Others
 Fort Churchill (HBC vessel), motor sailing vessel operated by the HBC from 1913-1939 mainly in James Bay serving York Factory and Moose Factory, see Hudson's Bay Company vessels

See also
 Churchill, Manitoba